The Byzantine emperor, Pope of Rome, and Patriarch of Constantinople often came into conflict during the Byzantine Papacy (537–752). Rival claimants to either See or the throne often buttressed their authority by the endorsement of or attempted to depose other incumbents.

Byzantine Empire-related lists